is a former Japanese football player.

Playing career
Imoto was born in Saga Prefecture on September 29, 1976. After graduating from high school, he joined the Prefectural Leagues club KT Mezura SC in 1995. In 1999, he moved to the Japan Football League club Mito HollyHock. He played often as midfielder and the club was promoted to the J2 League in 2000. However he did not play as much, and retired at the end of the 2000 season.

Club statistics

References

External links

1976 births
Living people
Association football people from Saga Prefecture
Japanese footballers
J2 League players
Japan Football League players
Mito HollyHock players
Association football midfielders